The Bay of Cádiz is a body of water in the province of Cádiz, Spain, adjacent to the southwestern coast of the Iberian Peninsula.

The Bay of Cádiz adjoins the Gulf of Cádiz, a larger body of water which is in the same area but further offshore.

Geography
The shores of the Bay of Cádiz include the municipalities of Cádiz, San Fernando, Puerto Real, El Puerto de Santa María, and Rota.

The bay forms a natural harbour which according to available archaeological evidence has been inhabited since very ancient times.
The Bahía de Cádiz Natural Park is located on the shores of the Bay of Cádiz.

There is also a comarca with the name Bay of Cádiz.

See also
Gulf of Cádiz
List of Ramsar sites in Spain
List of Sites of Community Importance in Andalusia

References

External links
 
 Puerto de la Bahía de Cádiz

Bays of Spain
Geography of the Province of Cádiz
Landforms of Andalusia
Ramsar sites in Spain